Trophonella is a genus of sea snails, marine gastropod mollusks in the family Muricidae, the murex snails or rock snails.

Species
Species within the genus Trophonella include:
 Trophonella echinolamellata (Powell, 1951)
 Trophonella enderbyensis (Powell, 1958) (taxon inquirendum)
 Trophonella eversoni (Houart, 1997)
 Trophonella longstaffi (E.A. Smith, 1907)
 Trophonella rugosolamellata Harasewych & Pastorino, 2010
 Trophonella scotiana (Powell, 1951)
 Trophonella shackletoni (Hedley, 1911)

References

External links
 ARCO A., SCHIAPARELLI S., HOUART R., OLIVERIO M. (2012). Cenozoic evolution of Muricidae (Mollusca, Neogastropoda) in the Southern Ocean, with the description of a new subfamily. ZOOLOGICA SCRIPTA, vol. 41, p. 596-616
 Harasewych, M.G. & Pastorino, G. 2010. Trophonella (Gastropoda: Muricidae), a New Genus from Antarctic Waters, with the Description of a New Species. The Veliger 51(1): 85-103

 
Pagodulinae